Danilo Palomer Santiago (born November 27, 1951) is a Full-time Filipino Eclectic painter, professor and Department Chair of University of Santo Tomas - College of Fine Arts and Design (UST-CFAD), Painting Department. His murals are displayed at the Malacaňang Palace, UST Main Building - Faculty of Civil Law and Veterans Memoraila Medical Center and whose works won awards in various art competitions. He was born in Sorsogon, Philippines and now lives in Manila.

Early life 

Santiago was born in Irosin, Sorsogon on November 27, 1951. He started his painting career when he entered college in 1971 at age 17 and finished his college education at the University of Santo Tomas College of Architecture and Fine Arts in Manila, with a degree in Painting in 1978. He is also a scholar in the College of Architecture and Fine Arts of UST during his schooldays. He finished his masteral degree in Fine Arts at the UST Graduate School.  He now teaches Drawing & painting in the UST Painting Department where he is also the department chair.

Awards 

 Dangal ng UST: GAWAD SAN ALBERTO MAGNO - Visual Arts (Fine Arts & Design) 2009
 UST Benavides Award - College of Architecture and Fine Arts 1979
 Art Association of the Philippines 1979 Art Competition - Gold medalist
 Kulay sa Tubig: Watercolor Painting Competition - Top 5 Watercolorists
    Best Entry - UST On-the-spot painting Competition 1973
    Best Entry - UST On-the-spot Painting Competition 1975
   Award of Recognition in Art Education and Painting -80th Painting Anniversary - UST Atelier Association (2015)
   Grand Prize - Sto. Nino On-the-spot Painting Competition, Malolos, Bulacan- 1979

Style and influence 

Danilo Santiago is an Eclectic Artist. He is skillful in several art media such as watercolor, oil, pastels and others and applies different art movements in every painting he made. He offers a fresh and colorful point of view, a glimpse of his luminous genius in his individual works of art. He was trained under Angelito Antonio, Antonio Austria, Bonifacio Cristobal, Wenceslao Garcia, Diosdado Lorenzo, and Mario Parial.

Paintings

Exhibitions

One-man shows 
 Kulay Isa - Gallery 1, San Juan, 1977
 Alay-kapwa - Makati Showroom, Makati, Philippines
 Ecology - Gen Luna Gallery, Davao City, Philippines
 Mithiin Makapilipino - Gallery Genesis, Mandaluyong, Philippines
 Inigma - Heritage Gallery, Cubao, Quezon City, Philippines

Group exhibitions 

 Benavidez Art Group : First group show - February 1, 2014, Art Asia Gallery, Megamall
 AAP Selected Artists Exhibit 2013 - November 11, 2013, Adamson University Art Gallery, San Marcelino St. Ermita, Manila.
 1st Beato Angelico Visual Arts and Design Conference and Exhibit - February 16, 2013, National Museum of the Philippines
 Philippine - Korea International Exhibition 2012
 BazaART ‘09 - at One Workshop Gallery, August 29 and 30, features paintings, photographs, sculptures, etchings and prints by Filipino greats and foreign artists
 Kristo Exhibit: 'Into Thy Hands'  - the exhibit was featured in two separate displays at the 1/Of Gallery in Serendra, Bonifacio Global City, Taguig and at the Choice Expression Gallery in Makati.
BIKOL EXPRESSIONS - Art Center,Megamall, Mandaluyong, Philippines -2015
"Meeting of the Minds"- ArtAsia Gallery, megamall, Mandaluyong, Philippines
"Brushstrokes"- Students and faculty joint exhibit for the Freshmen Parents' Orientation of Painting Program of CFAD-UST

Affiliated art groups

Art Association of the Philippines 

Art Association of the Philippines is an art organization that aims to "advance and foster, and promote the interests of those who work in the visual arts
 2014 - 2016 OFFICER Vice President - External Affairs
 2012 - 2014 OFFICER Auditor

Benavidez Art Group 

Benavidez Art Group is an exclusive group of eight Thomasian alumni artists. They share a common love and discipline for the art and a common vision which is very much aligned to being a Thomasian.

Tuesday Group of Artists

Tuesday Art Group is a small group of Filipino artists decided to tear down the disarray among local visual artists, and organized an umbrella group called Visual Artists Cooperative of the Philippines (VACOOP). Otherwise known as the Tuesday Group of Artists.

Pintanaw Art Group

Gruppo Biswal 

Gruppo Biswal an art group composed of visual artists who work using various media.

Grupong Tomasino 

Grupong Tomasino is group of 69 alumni and faculty members of UST-CFAD.

BIKOL Expressions Art Group

Other facts 

 He is also participated in the OTSAA (On The Spot Artists’ Association, Incorporation) attempt to break the Guinness World Records for the longest painting on a continuous canvas along with 300 participants.

References 

1951 births
Living people
Filipino painters
People from Sorsogon
University of Santo Tomas alumni
Academic staff of the University of Santo Tomas